Kahootz Toys was a toy company based in Ann Arbor, Michigan, best known for the relaunch of the classic toy Spirograph.

Kahootz founded in January 2012 by Doug Cass, Colleen Loughman, Joe Yassay, and Brent Oeschger after their previous company, Giddy Up, was sold.  Kahootz' initial product offerings were Spirograph and Pomz. In a 2013 interview, Cass stated that they brought back the Spirograph because they saw an opportunity for success in the nostalgia market and felt that it would do well. The first shipment of Spirograph arrived just before Christmas in 2012.

The Spirograph (along with Kahootz' Lite-Brite) was exhibited at the 2013 Sweet Suite 13 show in Chicago, Illinois and the 2014 American International Toy Fair in New York City, New York. Since then, Kahootz Toys has expanded and released numerous new products and lines.

In 2019 Kahootz launched Y'Art™, a brand of craft kits that allows consumers to color-by-number with yarn. The craft kits were debuted at Toy Fair of the same year and led to the puppy kit winning the ASTRA Best Toys for Kids award in the Arts & Crafts: 7+ category.

Kahootz was acquired by PlayMonster in November 2019.

Brands 

 Spirograph
 Y'Art
 Fashion Plates
 LatchKits
 Waterfuls
 Colorforms
 Fashion Press
 Stitchkits
 Popoids
 Plasticine
 HypnoGizmo
 Action Plates
 Rotodraw
 Creative Galaxy
 Romper Room
 Lite-Brite (discontinued)
 Pomz (discontinued)

Awards

References

External links 

 

Toy companies of the United States
Manufacturing companies based in Michigan
Companies based in Ann Arbor, Michigan
American companies established in 2012
Toy companies established in 2012
2012 establishments in Michigan
2019 mergers and acquisitions
 Defunct toy manufacturers